is the eighth work of the Musha Gundam series. Running period, 1996 to 1997.

Outline 
The series name is changed to Chou SD Sengokuden. The characters for this chapter are derived from mobile weapons of Mobile Suit Gundam Wing.  As this chapter is the continuation 15 years after the previous work; characters from the previous work make appearances. For the BB Senshi line, new specially processed parts are used to portray Kirahagane—transparent plastic with a thin layer of foil, the details and pattern appear in full colour.  This technique was first used in the wings of Chou Kidou Daishougun.

Story 

The story starts with an amnestic Tenrei Gundam waking up.  As he walk, trying to recall his past he was attacked by the Hyakki Yakou Shuu who claim that he is a Gundam.  With that he confirmed a part of his identity.  Later he fainted during a fight against Mazaku and was brought to Retteijou.  There he became part of the Gundam Army and fought against the Hyakki Yakou Shuu.  During one of the battles it was found out the Blaster is V-ou Daoshougun's brother. But when the Gundam Army was about to save Blaster, Jyarei interfered and the two fused to become a new single entity, Gundam Yami Gensui.  The strong attacks of Yami Gensui put the Gundam Army at a tight spot.  With Tallgeese's active participation V no suke is released but that resulted in Yami Gensui becoming the more powerful Shin Yami Gensui.  At that time, the consciousness of Godmaru in Tenrei's memory is awakened and they evolved into Kishin Daishougun Shiryuuou. Shiryuuou, drawing strength from the guardian beasts of the three countries, defeated Shin Yami Gensui.  Having completed his mission Godmaru, now Neo Godmaru, returns to the Heavens.

Characters

Ark 
Tenrei Gundam/ Kishin Daishougun Shiryuuou (天零頑駄無/輝神大将軍獅龍凰)
Design basis: Wing Gundam Zero
A musha who had lost the memories of his past. He once suspected that he is Godmaru but actually he is the disciple of Godmaru. Godmaru met Tenrei during his journey five years ago. Tenrei died covering for the assassination attempt by Jarei of his master. To save Tenrei, Godmaru transferred his soul to Tenrei through the help of Bird Gundam. The revival technique caused the amnesia. The awakening of Godmaru in Tenrei brought about the transformation into Shiryuuou.
In both the Comic World and Bom Bom versions the name Tenrei is derived from the Rei character on Tenrei's Kirahagane armour, it is not known if it is his true name.

Jyuuha Gundam (獣破頑駄無)
 Design basis: Gundam Heavyarms
A shapeshifting ninja of the Blade Ningun. A capable one, he is the oniwaban of the Daishougun. Able to change to a white tiger form called Hyakkomaru.

Saiga Gundam/ Saiko Doga (砕牙頑駄無/砕虎導牙)
 Design basis: Gundam Deathscythe Hell, Rote Doga
With his master's son captured by the Hyakki Yakou Shuu, he is forced to join the Hyakki Yakou Shuu under the mask of Saiko Doga. Later reverted to the Gundam Army when his master's son is saved.

Hyakuretsu Shou Gundam (百烈将頑駄無)
 Design basis: Prototype Z Gundam
Tactician of Ark. A descendant of Hyakkushiki from the Musha Shichinin Shuu Hen who had attained the Shou Gundam title. He supports the young daishougun with his calm and decisiveness. His wisdom is well-known in the Gundam Army.

V-ou Daishougun (武威凰大将軍)
Elder son of Victory Daishougun and the current daishougun. With the loss of his brother during the last war he received twice the care from his parents. Under the hint from the Bujinzou, he combined with Gouenou's Metal Leo (鉄鋼獅子) and became Gouen V-ou Daishougun.

Shinou Gundam (新凰頑駄無)
 Design basis: Gundam X
Younger brother of V-ou Daishougun, childhood name V no suke (武威の助).  He was found during the last war by Jarei and was raised by Jarei as Blaster.  Saved from Yami Gensui by best friend Tallgeese and through their friendship he awakened to become Shinou.

Daisenki Gundam/ Musha Gelgoog (大旋鬼頑駄無/武者牙流紅具)
A Choushougun under V-ou Daishougun, the master of Saiga.  Working undercover in the Hyakki Yakou Shuu as Musha Gelgoog.

Gekiryuuha Gundam (撃流破頑駄無)
A Choushougun under V-ou Daishougun, a disciple of Bakuryuu.  He is able to exert five times his power in Gekihagane mode where his body becomes Shiro Hagane.

Tekki Musha Bakushinmaru (鉄機武者爆進丸)
Design basis: ZZ Gundam
Built by Bakuryuu before Haganemaru, a prototype of the Tekki Musha.  A machine of great power but was discontinued as the power cannot be controlled. Like Haganemaru, he too possess a self conscious but Bakushinmaru does not have feelings.  He is on a journey searching for true friends.  During the journey he was captured and controlled by the Hyakki Yakou Shuu to attack Retteijou.  With Gundam Gouenou's active participation, Bakushinmaru regain control of himself.
Similar to Haganemaru he too has his gigantic Konkou Bakushinmaru form (金剛爆進丸形態).

Musha Godmaru/ Neo Godmaru (武者號斗丸/新號斗丸)
Protagonist of the previous work. Missing after the battle with Master Daishougun.  After that he was seen practising fencing with Tenrei.  The details of their meeting is unknown.  Neo Godmaru is the new form of Godmaru when he separated from Tenrei after the final battle with Shin Yami Gensui.

Touha Four Devas (闘覇四天王) 
Also known as the New Fuurinkazan Four Devas.

Kaen no Kiryuu (火炎の輝龍)
Kiryuu after succeeding the Armour of Fire.

Hayate no Max (疾風の真紅主)
Max after succeeding the Armour of Wind.

Mitsurin no Rose (密林の鷺主)
Rose after succeeding the Armour of the Forest.

Kyosan no Bolt (巨山の冒流刀)
Bolt after succeeding the Armour of the Mountain.

Abram 
Rairyuu Gundam (雷龍頑駄無)
 Design basis: Altron Gundam
Son of Gundam Hakuryuu Taitei.  He came to Ark to inform the daishougun of his succession to Ryuutei but got caught up with the fight with the Hyakki Yakou Shuu.

Albion 
Gundam Gouenou (頑駄無轟炎王)
 Design basis: Gundam Sandrock
Son of Gundam Ashuraou. The 30th child and only son of Ashuraou (one of Ashuraou's daughters, Nooberu appeared in the previous work).  He uses the Power Loader (鋼動甲冑), another form of Metal Leo, in battle.  The Metal Leo is created by Shouha.

Hyakki Yakou Shuu (百鬼夜行衆) 
Gundam Yami Gensui/ Shin Yami Gensui (頑駄無闇元帥/真闇元帥)
Design basis: Gundam Epyon
Leader of the Hyakki Yakou Shuu.  Was created when Jarei, who is Yamimajin in another form, take in Blaster Gundam.  The consciousness of Yamimajin, who was defeated by Victory Daishougun, is in control of the body.  A cold and cruel character who is bent on killing the Gundam Army and to fully open the Gate of the Netherworld to completely revive the Darkness.
With Blaster rescued from within, Yami Gensui becomes his true form, Shin Yami Gensui.  As Shin Yami Gensui, his dark powers are at their peak.

Blaster Gundam (武羅星頑駄無)
Design basis: Gundam Epyon
Son of Master Gundam. He hates the Gundam Army and is determined to avenge his father. But his true identity is V no suke, the younger son of Victory Daishougun and brother of V-ou. He was found by Jarei fifteen years ago at the battle of Retteijou and was raised as the son of Master.

Four Mashou (四魔将) 
Musha Tallgeese (武者刀流義守)
 Design basis: Tallgeese II
 The Touken Mashou (刀剣魔将) of the Four Mashou. He is the best friend of Blaster.  Both Blaster and he had been learning fencing together since they were young.  Later on when Blaster was saved and switched sides to the Gundam Army, he followed.

Jarei (邪麗)
 Design basis: Qubeley
 The Oni Mashou (鬼魔将) of the Four Mashou.  She was originally a shrine maiden but became a vessel for the consciousness of Yamimajin when it escaped fifteen years ago from the opening of the Netherworld gates.

Bourei Jio (亡霊 璽悪)
 The Bourei Mashou (亡霊魔将) of the Four Mashou. The spirit of Jio from the Fuurinkazan Hen which was revived when Master opened the Netherworld gates fifteen years ago. He is the one who captured the son of Saiga's master.

Mazaku (魔殺駆)
 The Aka Mashou (赤魔将) of the Four Mashou. The revival of Mazuka from the Shichinin no Choushougun Hen. He has mastered the way to change to the Batou Musha form via his own will.

Glossary 
Bujinzou (武神像)
A mysterious statue that appeared before Tenrei and the others. It appears to be a form assumed by Godmaru.

Hyakki Yakou Shuu (百鬼夜行衆)
An army formed by Blaster, the son of Master raised by Jarei.

SD Gundam